The fourteenth season of the tattoo reality competition Ink Master premiered on Paramount+ on September 7, 2022. The season ran for 10 episodes, with the finale premiering on November 2, 2022. The show was revived after its cancellation in 2020 as part of Paramount Network's then-planned shift to movies. Lead vocalist of Good Charlotte, Joel Madden serves as the new host and judge, replacing Dave Navarro. Three new judges replaced Chris Núñez and Oliver Peck, including season 8 winner, Ryan Ashley, Ami James, and Nikko Hurtado. This is the first season of the show to have four regular judges.

This season sees ten returning artists, as well as four winning artists, from previous seasons to compete for the title of Ink Master and $250,000. The artists were announced ahead of the premiere. Navarro appears as the "Master of Chaos", introducing new twists to the challenges.

DJ Tambe won the season, making this his third win, with Gian Karle being runner-up, Bob Jones placing third, and Creepy Jason placing fourth.

Judging and ranking

Judging panel
The judging panel is a table of four primary judges. The judges make their final decision by voting to see who had best tattoo of the day, and who goes home.

Jury of Peers
All the artists together discuss to determine the three artists who will be up for elimination. In the finale, some of the eliminated artists determined the first artist for the top three and then helped the judges break the tie to determine the winner of the season.

Contestants
Names, original season, original outcome, and outcome.

Notes

Contestant progress

 The contestant won Ink Master.
 The contestant was the runner-up.
 The contestant finished third in the competition.
 The contestant finished fourth in the competition.
 The contestant advanced to the finale.
 The contestant won the Tattoo Marathon.
 The contestant was exempt from the first elimination.
 The contestant won Best Tattoo of the Day.
 The contestant won their Head-to-Head challenge.
 The contestant was among the top.
 The contestant received positive critiques.
 The contestant received mixed critiques.
 The contestant received negative critiques.
 The contestant was in the bottom.
 The contestant was put in the bottom by the Jury of Peers
 The contestant was eliminated from the competition.
 The contestant was put in the bottom by the Jury of Peers and was eliminated from the competition.
 The contestant returned as a guest in the episode.

Episodes

No More Ink
No More Ink is a web series that serves as an after show and is posted on the show's official YouTube channel. After a contestant is eliminated from the competition, they are interviewed by Ryan Ashley, as they talk about their experience on the show and get more insight on the artists' life. Each episode is generally posted a day after a new episode of the main series premieres.
Episode 1: Chris Shockley (aired September 8, 2022)
Episode 2: Deanna Smith (aired September 8, 2022)
Episode 3: Hiram Casas (aired September 15, 2022)
Episode 4: Holli Marie (aired September 29, 2022)
Episode 5: Steve Tefft (aired September 29, 2022)
Episode 6: Pon DeMan (aired October 6, 2022)
Episode 7: Katie McGowan (aired October 13, 2022)
Episode 8: Tony Medellin (aired October 20, 2022)
Episode 9: Anthony Michaels (aired October 27, 2022)
Episode 10: Angel Rose (aired November 3, 2022)
Episode 11: Creepy Jason (aired November 3, 2022)
Episode 12: Bob Jones (aired November 4, 2022)
Episode 13: Gian Karle (aired November 4, 2022)
Episode 14: DJ Tambe (aired November 4, 2022)

References

External links 
 Official website
 
 

2022 American television seasons
Ink Master